Southwest Hills is a neighborhood in the West Hills (Tualatin Mountains) in the southwest section of Portland, Oregon, United States.  The northeastern part of the neighborhood, above Goose Hollow and Downtown Portland, is known as Portland Heights.  Much of the western portion of the neighborhood lies outside the Portland city limits, in unincorporated Multnomah County.

Neighborhood landmarks include Council Crest Park and Ainsworth Elementary School.

Parks 
Council Crest Park - SW Council Crest Dr.
Governors Park - SW 13th Ave & Davenport St.
Marquam Nature Park - SW Marquam St & Sam Jackson Park Rd.
Norris House & Property - 4455 SW Terwilliger Blvd.
Portland Heights Park - SW Patton Rd. & Old Orchard Rd.

Coordinates
Portland Heights is located at 
Council Crest is located at

References

 
Neighborhoods in Portland, Oregon